The Film Programme was a British film review radio programme, broadcast weekly on BBC Radio 4, from 2004 to 2021, presented by Francine Stock.

The programme had a number of regular contributors, including Neil Brand and Rosemary Fletcher.

The programme's BBC Programme Identifier was b006r5jt.
Its regular presenters included Francine Stock and Antonia Quirke.

It was confirmed in September 2021 that the programme was to be axed and replaced by a new show with the title "Screenshot" to be hosted by Mark Kermode and Ellen E Jones.  The last scheduled programme was broadcast on 30 September 2021, co-hosted by Francine Stock and Antonia Quirke.

References

External links 

 Official BBC web page

BBC Radio 4 programmes
Film criticism radio series